Emmanuel Marie Louis, marquis de Noailles (1743–1822) was a French diplomat and ambassador to Hamburg from 1768 to 1770, to Amsterdam from 1770 to 1776, to London 1776–1783, and to Vienna 1783–1792.  He was the second son of Louis, 4th duc de Noailles.  Lafayette visited him, in 1776, before embarking for America, as he promised.

See also
 List of Ambassadors of France to the United Kingdom

References

Ambassades de Messieurs de Noailles en Angleterre, Mr. Abbot of VmrtotI 

Marquesses of Noailles
Emmanuel Marie Louis
Noailles, Antoine, Emmanuel Marie Louis, marquis de
Noailles, Antoine, Emmanuel Marie Louis, marquis de
Ambassadors of France to the Netherlands
Ambassadors of France to Great Britain
Ambassadors of France to Austria
18th-century French diplomats